Beilby Richard Lawley, 2nd Baron Wenlock (2 April 1818 – 6 November 1880) was an English nobleman, eldest son of Paul Thompson, 1st Baron Wenlock and 8th Baronet. He succeeded in the Barony and Baronetcy and to the family estate at Escrick, Yorkshire on the death of his father in 1852.

He served in the Yorkshire Hussars latterly as Colonel, was Member of Parliament for Pontefract 1851–1852 and was Lord Lieutenant of the East Riding of Yorkshire 1864–1880.

He married Lady Elizabeth Grosvenor, daughter of Richard Grosvenor, 2nd Marquess of Westminster, and had eight children, including four sons who each in turn succeeded to the titles. Among his children were:
Hon. Caroline Elizabeth Lawley (1848 – 13 July 1934), married Lt.-Col. Caryl Molyneaux (d. 1912), son of Charles Molyneux, 3rd Earl of Sefton and had issue
Hon. Alethea Jane Lawley (1851 1929), historian, married the Italian musicologist and composer Taddeo Wiel (1849–1920)
Beilby Lawley, 3rd Baron Wenlock (1849–1912)
Hon. Constance Mary Lawley (1854 – 4 May 1951), married first on 19 June 1877 Captain Eustace Vesey (d. 1886), son of Thomas Vesey, 3rd Viscount de Vesci and had issue, married second on 7 July 1892 Edward Portman (d. 1911), son of Henry Portman, 2nd Viscount Portman
Richard Lawley, 4th Baron Wenlock (1856–1918)
Rev. Algernon Lawley, 5th Baron Wenlock (1857–1931)
Arthur Lawley, 6th Baron Wenlock (1860–1932)

He was succeeded by his eldest son Beilby.

References
thePeerage.com

External links 
 

Barons in the Peerage of the United Kingdom
Eldest sons of British hereditary barons
Lord-Lieutenants of the East Riding of Yorkshire
Lawley, Beilby Richard
Lawley, Beilby Richard
UK MPs who inherited peerages
1818 births
1880 deaths
Yorkshire Hussars officers